Boleslaus II (Boleslav II, Boleslaw II, Bolesław II) may refer to:

 Boleslaus II, Duke of Bohemia (died 999)
 Bolesław II the Generous (c. 1041 or 1042–1081 or 1082)
 Bolesław II, Duke of Cieszyn (c. 1425/28 – 1452)
 Bolesław II the Horned (c. 1220/5 – 1278; a.k.a. Bolesław II the Bald), Duke of Kraków in 1241, of Southern Greater Poland 1241–1247, and of all Silesia–Wrocław 1241-1248
 Bolesław II of Masovia (c. 1251 – 1313)

See also
Boleslaus (disambiguation), other kings of this name